Stalin: A Biography is a biography of Joseph Stalin written by Robert Service. It was published in 2004.

For his research, Service traveled to Abkhazia, where Stalin's datcha was located during the 1930s.

The book is a descriptive account of Stalin's life, covering in detail his youth, rise to power and rule. According to the publisher, it uses a personal style which "humanizes Stalin without ever diminishing the extent of the atrocities he unleashed upon the Soviet population."

Notes

External links
 Review by Angus MacQueen
 Review by Fred Williams
Presentation by Service on Stalin: A Biography, April 29, 2005, C-SPAN

2004 non-fiction books
Biographies of Joseph Stalin
Robert Service (historian)
Georgian biographies